John Taylor (12 December 1885 – 15 September 1916) was a Scottish professional footballer who made over 120 Southern League appearances as a inside right for Gillingham. He also played in the Scottish League for Leith Athletic and in the Football League for Hull City.

Personal life 
Taylor served as a private in the Royal Scots during the First World War and was killed on the Somme on 15 September 1916. He is commemorated on the Thiepval Memorial.

Career statistics

References 

1885 births
1916 deaths
People from Elgin, Moray
Scottish footballers
Gillingham F.C. players
Hull City A.F.C. players
Leith Athletic F.C. players
Tunbridge Wells F.C. players
British Army personnel of World War I
Royal Scots soldiers
Southern Football League players
English Football League players
Association football inside forwards
British military personnel killed in the Battle of the Somme
Parkhead F.C. players
Lisburn Distillery F.C. players
St Bernard's F.C. players
Scottish Football League players
Scottish military personnel
Sportspeople from Moray